Macrocheles pisentii is a species of mite in the family Macrochelidae. It is specialized to live in the nests of Scarabaeus beetles. The mite can be found in Europe, Israel, and northern Africa.

References

pisentii
Articles created by Qbugbot
Animals described in 1882